Donna Jordan (born 1950) is an American actress and model. She is most well-known as a Warhol superstar and for being one of “Antonio’s Girls”, models and muses of fashion illustrator Antonio Lopez.

Career
Donna Jordan was “discovered” in New York, alongside Jane Forth, by Antonio Lopez. His muses, known as “Antonio’s Girls”, included Jessica Lange, Jerry Hall, and Grace Jones. Jordan followed Lopez to Paris in 1970 and within a year was in the cover of Vogue and an in-demand model, much desired for her modern, all-American style and electric personality.

Jordan was photographed by Helmut Newton, Guy Bourdin and Oliviero Toscani in the 1970s, was dubbed "Disco Marilyn", and appeared on the front covers of Vogue Italia and Vogue Paris. Her signature look consisted of bleached blonde hair, a gap-toothed smile, and bright red lipstick.

Jordan co-starred in the 1973 Andy Warhol film, L'Amour with Jane Forth.

Selected filmography
 L'Amour (1973)
 The Perfume of the Lady in Black (1974)

References

External links
 

1950 births
American female models
20th-century American actresses
American film actresses
Living people
Date of birth missing (living people)
Place of birth missing (living people)
21st-century American women